Diaptomidae is a family of freshwater pelagic copepods. It includes around 50 genera:

Acanthodiaptomus Kiefer, 1932
Aglaodiaptomus Light, 1938
Allodiaptomus Kiefer, 1936
Arctodiaptomus Kiefer, 1932
Argyrodiaptomus Brehm, 1933
Aspinus Brandorff, 1973
Austrinodiaptomus Reid, 1997
Calchas Brehm, 1949
Calodiaptomus Kiefer, 1936
Camerundiaptomus Dumont & Chiambeng, 2002
Colombodiaptomus Gaviria, 1989
Copidodiaptomus Kiefer, 1968
Dactylodiaptomus Kiefer, 1936
Dasydiaptomus Defaye & Dussart, 1993
Dentodiaptomus Shen & Tai, 1964
Diaptomus Westwood, 1836
Dolodiaptomus Shen & Tai, 1964
Dussartius Kiefer, 1978
Eodiaptomus Kiefer, 1932
Eudiaptomus Kiefer, 1932
Filipinodiaptomus Mamaril & Fernando, 1978
Gigantodiaptomus Kiefer, 1932
Hadodiaptomus Brancelj, 2005
Heliodiaptomus Kiefer, 1932
Hemidiaptomus G. O. Sars, 1903
Hesperodiaptomus Light, 1938
Idiodiaptomus Kiefer, 1936
Keraladiaptomus Santos Silva, Kakkassery, Mass & Dumont, 1994
Leptodiaptomus Light, 1938
Ligulodiaptomus Shen & Tai, 1962
Mastigodiaptomus Light, 1939
Megadiaptomus Kiefer, 1936
Metadiaptomus Methuen, 1910
Microdiaptomus Osorio-Tafall, 1942
Mixodiaptomus Kiefer, 1932
Mongolodiaptomus Kiefer, 1937
Nannodiaptomus Dang & Ho, 2001
Natrodiaptomus Stella, 1984
Neodiaptomus Kiefer, 1932
Neutrodiaptomus Kiefer, 1937
Nordodiaptomus M. S. Wilson, 1951
Notodiaptomus Kiefer, 1936
Occidodiaptomus Borutzky in Borutsky, Stepanova & Kos, 1991
Odontodiaptomus Kiefer, 1936
Onychodiaptomus Light, 1939
Paradiaptominae Kiefer, 1932
Paradiaptomus Daday, 1910
Phyllodiaptomus Kiefer, 1936
Prionodiaptomus Light, 1939
Pseudolovenula Marukawa, 1921
Rhacodiaptomus Kiefer, 1936
Scolodiaptomus Reid, 1987
Sinodiaptomus Kiefer, 1932
Skistodiaptomus Light, 1939
Spelaeodiaptomus Dussart, 1970
Speodiaptomus Borutzky, 1962
Spicodiaptomus Rajendran, 1973
Stygodiaptomus Petkovski, 1981
Thermodiaptomus Kiefer, 1932
Troglodiaptomus Petkovski, 1978
Tropodiaptomus Kiefer, 1932
Tumeodiaptomus Dussart, 1979
Vietodiaptomus Dang, 1977

References

 
Calanoida
Crustacean families